Savaş Yılmaz (born 1 January 1990) is a Turkish professional footballer who plays as a midfielder for Sarıyer. He is a youth international, earning caps at the U-16, U-17, U-18, and U-19 levels.

References

External links
 

1990 births
People from Sürmene
Living people
Turkish footballers
Turkey youth international footballers
Turkey under-21 international footballers
Association football midfielders
Zeytinburnuspor footballers
Kayserispor footballers
Samsunspor footballers
Boluspor footballers
1461 Trabzon footballers
Manisaspor footballers
Adana Demirspor footballers
Sarıyer S.K. footballers
Sakaryaspor footballers
Süper Lig players
TFF First League players
TFF Second League players
TFF Third League players